Taruja Pincha (Aymara taruja deer, pincha irrigation channel or ditch, "deer ditch", Hispanicized spelling Tarucapincha) or Taruka Pincha (Quechua taruka deer, pincha aqueduct; sewer) is a mountain in the Peruvian Andes, about  high. It is located in the Puno Region, Azángaro Province, on the border of the districts Muñani and Potoni.

References

Mountains of Puno Region
Mountains of Peru